A tuned pipe is a part of the exhaust system of some two-stroke engines.

Tuned pipe can also mean:

 In acoustics, a resonator, particularly but not only a tubular resonator.
 In music, an organ pipe.
 In music more generally, the resonator of any aerophone.
 In automotive engineering generally, the tuned exhaust system of a car or motorcycle engine.

See also

 Helmholtz resonator.